The Central Public Works Department (CPWD) is the Indian government authority in charge of public sector works. The CPWD, under the Ministry of Urban Development now MoHUA (Ministry of Housing and Urban Affairs), deals with buildings, roads, bridges, flyovers and other complicated structures including stadiums, auditoriums, laboratories, bunkers, border fencing and border roads (hill roads). The CPWD came into existence in July 1854 when Lord Dalhousie established a central agency for execution of public works and set up Ajmer Provincial Division. It has now grown into a comprehensive construction management department, which provides services from project conception to completion, and maintenance management.

It is headed by the Director General (DG) who is also the Principal Technical Advisor to the Government of India. The regions and sub-regions are headed by Special DGs and Additional DGs respectively, while the zones in all state capitals (except a few) are headed by Chief Engineers. Nowadays, a new post of Chief Project Manager (CPM) has been created to head major prestigious projects of CPWD. CPMs are equivalent to the rank of Chief Engineers in CPWD.
With country wide presence, the strength of CPWD is its ability to undertake construction of Complex Projects even in difficult terrains and maintenance in post construction stage.

It is the prime engineering department of Government of union of India and its specifications and manuals are followed by local public works departments and engineering wing of other departments.

CPWD consists of three wings in execution field – B&R (Buildings and Roads), E&M (Electrical and Mechanical) and horticulture.

History

Centralized public works in India can be traced to efforts of Lord Dalhousie and Sir Arthur Cotton in the mid 19th century. Sir Arthur Cotton sums up the early policy of the East India Company rulers thus,

Public works have been almost entirely neglected throughout India. The motto hitherto has been: Do nothing, have nothing done, let nobody do anything. Bear any loss, let the people die of famine, let hundreds of lakhs be lost in revenue for want of water or roads, rather than do anything.

– Arthur Cotton (1854)

Lord Dalhousie established the Central Public Works Department, and irrigation projects were among the earliest to be started.

Public Works Department was formally established in the year 1854 in the sixth year of Lord Dalhousie's tenure as Governor General. In the minutes of meeting held on 12 July 1854 the Governor General resolved that a central agency be provided by creating an office of Secretary to the Government of India in Department of Public Works. The note recorded by Lord Dalhousie was as under:

“The organization of the Department of Public Works in the Indian Empire will be incomplete unless it shall be provided for the Supreme Government itself come agency by which it may be enabled to exercise the universal control confided to it over public works in India with the best of scientific knowledge with authority and system. The Government of India shall no longer be dependent on expedients, but should be provided with a permanent and highly qualified agency to assist in the direction of this important branch of public affairs. I have, therefore, now to propose that such an agency should be provided by creating an office of the Secretary to Government of India in the Department of Public Works. The person who holds it should always be a highly qualified officer of the Corps of Engineers.”

Colonel W.E. Baker of the Bengal Engineers was accordingly appointed first Secretary to the Department of Public Works, this is the genesis of the Central Public Works Department.

CPWD has PAN India presence and has ability to undertake construction of complex projects even in difficult terrain and maintenance in post construction stage. CPWD had been involved in construction of stadiums and other infrastructure requirements for Asian Games 1982 and Commonwealth Games 2010.

Zeal and spirit of endeavour of CPWD officers have taken the organization beyond national boundaries. CPWD had also constructed the Afghan Parliament Building.

Functions of CPWD 

Following are the core functions of CPWD
 Design, construction and maintenance of Central Government non- residential buildings other than those for Railways, Communications, Atomic Energy, Defense Services, All India Radio, Doordarshan and Airports (IAAI & NAA).
 Construction and maintenance of residential accommodation meant for Central Government Employees.
 Construction works for Central Armed Police Forces
 Construction works for establishments under the Cabinet Secretariat i.e. SSB, SIB etc.
 Construction works for public sector undertakings not having their engineering organization, other Government Organisations, Autonomous bodies and institutions as deposit work.  “Deposit Works” are such works, which are undertaken at the discretion of the Director General, CPWD for which the outlay is provided wholly or in part from
 a)  Funds of a public nature but not included in the financial estimates and accounts of the Union of India.
 b)  Contributions from the public.
 Providing consultancy services in planning, designing and construction of civil engineering projects, as and when required by public undertaking and other autonomous bodies.
 Construction of Embassy and other buildings / projects abroad at the request of Ministry of External Affairs and other Ministries.
 Defence / Security related works assigned by the government such as border fencing & flood lighting works and Indo China Border Road Works (ICBR).
 Construction of roads under PMGSY and RSVY programme. To undertake works under PPP/Alternate Funding mode.

Consultation & advisory functions 
The Director General of CPWD functions as Technical Advisor to the Government of India and is consulted in various technical matters relating to construction and maintenance. The Ministry of External Affairs consults CPWD with regard to construction and maintenance of the Embassy buildings abroad. As Technical Advisor to the Government of India, the Director General of CPWD or his nominee is associated with technical bodies and / or Standing Committees of various Institutions and Organisations. Some of the important organizations are:

 Central Building Research Institute, Roorkee
 Hindustan Prefab Limited, Delhi
 Indian Institute of Technology, Delhi
 Indian Agricultural Research Institute, Delhi 
 Indian National Group of the International Association for Bridges & Structural Engineering
 Indian National Society of Soil Mechanics and Foundation Engineering
 Indian Roads Congress
 Bureau of Indian Standards
 Indian Institute of Public Administration
 Indian Council for Foresting Research Education
 National Buildings Organisation
 National Productivity Council
 National Defence Academy, Khadakvasla
 Central University of Rajasthan
 Central University of Haryana

Recruitment 

The recruitment as entry level for middle management is made through Engineering Services Examination (ESE) conducted by Union Public Service Commission. Only top candidates in ESE get a chance to join CPWD strictly on merit basis. During probation period, the selected candidates undergo rigorous training of 52 weeks at National CPWD Academy situated in Ghaziabad (U.P).  which transforms them into competent Architects/Engineers cum bureaucrats. During the normal career progression one rises to Chief Architect/Engineer, then to Additional Director General and further to Special Director General. The apex level post in CPWD is of Director General, CPWD who also acts as technical advisor to the Government of India. Recently the Government of India has given the approval for creation of one more post of Director General (Planning). So from now onwards CPWD has two Director General Posts.

The job in CPWD is challenging yet rewarding. With pan India presence, CPWD has been involved in construction of strategically important mega projects all over the country including border areas. CPWD is well known for quality construction and timely completion of projects following which it has huge list of successful projects and departments as well as clients which it has served.

There are three cadres in CPWD:

1)  CAS (Central Architecture Services)2) CES (Central Engineering Services) for Civil Engineers

3) CEMES (Central Electrical and Mechanical Engineering Services) for Mechanical & Electrical Engineers

These are Group A Civil Services. (List of all Group A Civil Services: Civil Services of India)

Upon confirmation of service, a CPWD officer through Engineering Services Exam serves as an Assistant Executive Engineer for a period of 4 years which include 52 weeks of Foundation Training at the National CPWD Academy, Ghaziabad. In field, an Assistant Executive Engineer heads the entire Sub-Division. After the completion of 4 years, the officer is promoted to the grade of Executive Engineer which is equivalent to the Under Secretary to Government of India. Executive Engineer is the most challenging post in CPWD as the entire burden of the project is on them.

Training 

National CPWD Academy is a Training Institute of Central Public Works Department (CPWD) which primarily focuses on the training needs of Group ‘A’ officers of CPWD via 52 weeks foundation course. Originally a training cell was set up in New Delhi in year 1965 for foundation training of Group ‘A’ officers. This training cell was developed into a full-fledged Training Institute at Ghaziabad which started functioning in 1995. The CPWD training Institute was renamed as National CPWD Academy in the year 2016.

The National CPWD Academy looks after the training needs of Engineers, Architects, Horticulturists all across the country. The main academy is located at Kamla Nehru Nagar, Hapur Road, Ghaziabad (U.P.). Regional Training Institutes are located in the four metros i.e. New Delhi, Mumbai, Kolkata and Chennai.

The academy imparts training/refresher courses in all the aspects of public works. The academy conducts training programs, workshops, brain-storming sessions, seminars etc. to upgrade the techno-managerial skills of CPWD officers as well as officers of other Central Government Departments, State Governments and PSUs etc. The training programs are conducted in diverse streams such as Civil Engineering, Electrical and Mechanical Engineering, Architecture, IT Applications and Management Techniques. A number of new courses on Green Buildings, their rating system and certification, energy efficient buildings, conservation of heritage buildings etc. have been introduced to cater to the current changing construction scenario.

Objectives

• To train each and every employee from his induction into the department till the end of his career with an endeavour to ensure that the employees get a chance to participate in a properly structured training process to realize their full potential.

• To ensure that the officers are kept abreast with the changing technological scenario through refresher training courses to update their knowledge base towards emerging technologies & innovative materials.

• Enable CPWD management to implement and execute its Human Resources strategic objectives.

• Develop skills and competence in the workplace.

Other accolades

Centre of Excellence for Green Building Construction

The Academy has achieved the distinction of being declared as “Centre of Excellence” by MNRE for promoting Green Building Construction.

National Resource Institute for participation in NPCBEERM

The Academy has been enlisted by MHA as National Resource Institute to participate in NPCBEERM (National Programme for capacity building of Engineers in Earthquake Risk Management).

National Resource Institute for Capacity Building under “Sugamya Bharat Abhiyan”

National CPWD Academy has also been declared National Resource Institute for Capacity building in Access Audit under “Sugamya Bharat Abhiyan” by Ministry of Social Justice & Empowerment.

Regional Training Institutes (RTIs)

To cater the training needs of Group B & C officials of the department, four Regional Training Institutes are functioning at following locations:

 Northern Region - R.K.Puram, New Delhi
 Western Region - New Marine Lines, Mumbai
 Eastern Region - Salt Lake City, Kolkata
 Southern Region - Besant Nagar, Chennai

These institutes conduct training courses for Group B & C officials. Workers Training Centres at above locations are also part of Regional Training Institutes. Workers Training Centres impart skill improvement training to workers in various trades like mason, carpenter, plumber, mali, electrician, wireman etc. (erstwhile Group D staff). The skill development courses for workers are also conducted in association with Construction Industry Development Council (CIDC). After completion of the training, certification of the workers is also done through IGNOU.

Designations and career progression 

The various posts held by CPWD Gazetted Officers directly recruited through Engineering Services Examination is given in the table below.

State Public Works Departments in India 
 Karnataka Public Works Department
 Kerala Public Works Department
 Tamil Nadu Public Works Department
 Maharashtra Public Works Department
 Roads and Buildings Department, Gujarat
 Delhi Public Works Department
 Madhya Pradesh Public Works Department
West Bengal Public Works Department
Rajasthan Public Works Department
Uttarakhand Public Works Department
Uttar Pradesh Public Works Department

See Also 

 New Delhi Municipal Council

References 

Public works ministries
Ministry of Urban Development